Belarus competed at the Junior Eurovision Song Contest 2009, which took place in Kyiv, Ukraine. Yuriy Demidovich represented the country with the song "Volshebniy krolik".

Before Junior Eurovision

National final 
BTRC received a total of 63 entries to compete in the contest. On 31 March 2009, a professional jury, chaired by Vasily Rainchik, selected 17 songs to compete in the semi-final of the contest. This number was later increased to 19.

Semi-final 
On 1 June 2009, (International Children's Day) the semi-final of the contest was broadcast, being prerecorded in the BTRC studio a few days earlier, and was hosted by BTRC Eurovision commentator Denis Kuryan. A professional jury, again headed by Vasily Rainchik, selected ten songs from the 19 to proceed to the final of the event. 

"Belakrylyya mary" was the only song in Belorussian language in the running, while all other entries have been performed in Russian.

Final 
The final was held on 10 September 2009, and featured the following ten songs which qualified from the semi-final. The winner was determined by a 50/50 combination of votes from a jury made up of music professionals and regional televoting.

At Eurovision

Voting

Notes

References

External links 
  BTRC website 

Belarus
Junior Eurovision Song Contest
2009